Mahmoud Karam (born 17 November 1982) is an Egyptian/Qatari handball player for Al Rayyan and the Qatari national team. He competed in the men's tournament at the 2004 Summer Olympics.

References

1982 births
Living people
Egyptian male handball players
Olympic handball players of Egypt
Handball players at the 2004 Summer Olympics